House of Culture is a cultural centre situated close to Stortorget in central Hamar, Norway. Kulturhuset was officially opened on March 14, 2014. It contains a library, movie theater, concert hall, cultural school, youth culture house, music workshop, cafe, gallery and office spaces. Hamar kulturhus is a regional cultural center subject to the municipality of Hamar and houses many different cultural institutions and actors.

See also 
 Kulturhuset

References

External links 
 
 

Concert halls in Norway
Event venues established in 2014
Tourist attractions in Norway
Buildings and structures in Hamar